Anne Royall (June 11, 1769 – October 1, 1854) was a travel writer, newspaper editor, and, by some accounts, the first professional female journalist in the United States.

Early life
She was born Anne Newport in Baltimore, Maryland. Anne grew up in the western frontier of Pennsylvania before her impoverished and fatherless family migrated south to the mountains of western Virginia. There, at 16, she and her widowed mother were employed as servants in the household of William Royall, a wealthy American Revolution major, freemason and deist who lived at Sweet Springs in Monroe County (now in West Virginia). Royall, a learned gentleman farmer twenty years Anne's senior, took an interest in her and arranged for her education, introducing her to the works of Shakespeare and Voltaire, and allowing her to make free use of his extensive library.

Marriage
Anne and William Royall were wed in 1797. The couple lived comfortably together for fifteen years until his death in 1812. His death touched off litigation between Anne and Royall's relatives, who claimed that they were never legally married and that his will leaving her most of his property was a forgery. After seven years, the will was nullified and she was left virtually penniless.

Career in journalism
Anne spent the next four years traveling around Alabama, writing letters to a friend about the evolution of the young state that were eventually turned into a manuscript published as Letters from Alabama. She also penned a novel called The Tennessean before setting off for Washington D.C.

She became an "itinerant storyteller", according to biographer Jeff Biggers, traveling first to the new state of Alabama, where she wrote the initial of her series of "Black Books". The popular volumes were "informative but sardonic portraits of the elite and their denizens from Mississippi to Maine". In an expanding nation, Royall's incisive descriptions of American life and individual Americans from many walks of life were popular reading and a sharp contrast to the sentimental literature penned by other female writers.

She arrived in Washington in 1824 to petition for a federal pension as the widow of a veteran; under the pension law at the time, widows had to plead their cases before Congress. She remained unsatisfied until Congress passed a new pension law in 1848. Even then, her husband's family claimed most of her pension money.

While in Washington attempting to secure a pension, Anne caught President John Quincy Adams during one of his usual early morning naked swims in the Potomac River. It is commonly recounted, but apocryphal, that she gathered the president's clothes and sat on them until he answered her questions, earning her the first presidential interview ever granted to a woman.

Adams afterward supported Anne's petition for a pension. He also invited her to visit his wife, Louisa Adams, at their home in Washington, which she did. Mrs. Adams gave her a white shawl when she journeyed north to obtain proof of her husband's military service.

Afterward Anne toured New England, Pennsylvania, New York and Massachusetts, all the while taking copious notes and using her Masonic connections to help fund her travels.

In Boston, she stopped in on former President John Adams to give him an update on his son and daughter-in-law. Then, in 1826, at 57, she published her notes in a book titled Sketches of History, Life and Manners in the United States. Her previous manuscript The Tennessean would follow a year later.

The caustic observations in her books and public stances on issues caused a stir and earned her some powerful enemies. She was derided as an eccentric scold, a virago, and (in the words of one newspaper editor) "a literary wild-cat from the backwoods". In 1829, Anne Royall returned to Washington, D.C. and began living on Capitol Hill, near a fire house. The firehouse, which had been built with federal money, had been allowing a small Presbyterian congregation to use its facilities for their services. Royall, who had long made Presbyterians a particular object of scorn in her writing, objected to their using the building as a blurring of the lines between church and state. She also claimed that some of the congregation's children began throwing stones at her windows. One member of the congregation began praying silently beneath her window and others visited her in an attempt to convert her, she claimed. Royall responded to their taunts with cursing and was arrested. She was tried and convicted of being a "public nuisance, a common brawler and a common scold". Although a ducking stool had been constructed nearby, the court ruled that the traditional common law punishment of ducking for a scold was obsolete, and she was instead fined $10. Two reporters from Washington's newspaper, The National Intelligencer, paid the fine. Embarrassed by the incident, Royall left Washington to continue traveling.

Back in Washington in 1831, she published a newspaper from her home with the help of a friend, Sally Stack. The paper, Paul Pry, exposed political corruption and fraud. Sold as single issues, it contained her editorials, letters to the editor and her responses, and advertisements. It was published until 1836, when it was succeeded by The Huntress. Royall hired orphans to set the type and faced constant financial woes, which were exacerbated when postmasters refused to deliver her issues to subscribers, until her death at 85 in 1854, bringing an end to her 30-year news career.

She is buried in the Congressional Cemetery.

References

Further reading
 Original text based on An Uncommon Scold by Cynthia Earman – Retrieved May 2004 from the Library of Congress' online archives
 Jeff Biggers (2017), The Trials of a Scold: The Incredible True Story of Writer Anne Royall, St. Martin's Press/Thomas Dunne Books.
 Elizabeth J. Clapp (2016), A Notorious Woman: Anne Royall in Jacksonian America University of Virginia Press
 Governor Lincoln Gets the Anne Royall Treatment
 Daniel Walker Howe, What Hath God Wrought: The Transformation of America, 1815–1848
 Sarah Harvey Porter (1908), The life and times of Anne Royall, Cedar Rapids, Iowa.

External links
 Cavalcade of America – February 20, 1940, radio dramatization of her life with Ethel Barrymore, via YouTube

1769 births
1854 deaths
19th-century American women writers
American women journalists
American women novelists
Burials at the Congressional Cemetery
Writers from Baltimore
People from Monroe County, West Virginia
19th-century American novelists
Novelists from West Virginia
Novelists from Maryland
19th-century American journalists